The Penguin Guide to Blues Recordings is an encyclopedia of blues music albums released on CD.

Content 
The book was released on 31 October 2006 and was written by Tony Russell and Chris Smith with contributions by Neil Slaven, Ricky Russell and Joe Faulkner. Russell in particular is known as a musical historian, working closely with programs presented on BBC Radio, as well as documentaries on the blues.

In the book, artists are set up alphabetically and include short (usually one paragraph) biographies before showing a complete listing of their discography. Each album includes title, a rating out of four stars, label, musicians on the album, month and year of recording, and finally a review of varying length.

See also 
 The Penguin Guide to Jazz

External links 
 Listing at Penguin Books.

Music history
Encyclopedias of music
Music guides
Penguin Books books